Nahal Yam was a Nahal settlement on the Mediterranean Sea coast of the Israeli-occupied Sinai Peninsula. The settlement was located 50 miles east of the Suez Canal.

History 
Nahal Yam was settled on October 3, 1967.

The Permanent Representative of the United Arab Republic to the United Nations described the settlement as a "colony" in a letter to the Security Council on November 22, 1967.

The Jewish Agency ordered a water desalination plant for the settlement in 1968.

On July 23, 1969, seven soldiers from the Nahal were injured when several bazooka shells detonated in the settlement.

On October 4, 1969, Egyptian aircraft dropped several bombs near the settlement, but did not result in damage or injuries.

On April 24, 1970, Egyptian aircraft dropped several bombs near the settlement, but caused no damage or injuries.

The Orith, an Israeli fishing boat, was sunk by an Egyptian missile off the coast of Nahal Yam on May 18, 1970. Two members of the crew clung to the wreckage and washed ashore at the settlement.

A group were charged for firing bazookas at the settlement on February 16, 1971.

On March 9, 1973, the Jewish Agency announced Nahal Yam would be abandoned.

References 

1967 establishments in Asia
1979 disestablishments in Asia
Nahal settlements
Former Israeli settlements in Sinai